Harry Bromley (30 November 1884 – 26 November 1937) was an Australian rules footballer who played with South Melbourne in the Victorian Football League (VFL).

Notes

External links 

1884 births
1937 deaths
Australian rules footballers from Victoria (Australia)
Sydney Swans players
Port Melbourne Football Club players
People from Shepparton